The Conquest of Bhulua refers to the 17th-century Mughal conquest of the Bhulua Kingdom, which covered much of the Noakhali region of Bangladesh. The campaign was led by Shaykh Abdul Wahid, under the orders of Islam Khan I, against Raja Ananta Manikya in 1613. The conquest of Bhulua allowed the Mughals to successfully penetrate through southeastern Bengal and conquer Chittagong and parts of Arakan.

Background
The Noakhali region was historically known as Bhulua and was ruled by the Bishwambhar Sur dynasty, an independent line of Hindu kings who enjoyed autonomy under the Sultanate of Bengal. The Mughal Empire defeated the Sultanate at the Battle of Rajmahal on 12 July 1576, formally establishing the Bengal as the easternmost province of the subcontinent-wide empire. However, the collapse of the Sultanate led to the formation of the Baro-Bhuiyans; a loose confederacy of independent chieftains across Bengal who continued to challenge Mughal domination. 

During the reign of Emperor Akbar, Raja Man Singh I (1594–1606) was the appointed Subahdar of Bengal and responsible for warding off rebellious chieftains in the region. The Bhulua Kingdom was then under the rule of Raja Lakshmana Manikya. Lakshmana was among the Baro-Bhuiyans of Bengal, and was succeeded by his son, Ananta Manikya.

Campaign
In 1608, Emperor Jahangir appointed Islam Khan Chishti as the Subahdar of Bengal, who continued his predecessors' campaigns to subdue the Baro-Bhuiyans and completely annex all of Bengal to the Mughal Empire. 

In 1613, Abdul Wahid was appointed as the main commander of the Bhulua expedition by the Subahdar of Bengal Islam Khan I. He had command over 50 elephants, 3000 matchlockers and 4000 cavalry (including 500 of the Subahdar's own cavalry), in addition to the forces of Mirza Nuruddin, Mirza Isfandiyar, Haji Shamsuddin Baghdadi, Khwaja Asl, Adil Beg and Mirza Beg. The local raja, Ananta Manikya, began to set up defences around Bhulua with the Magh king's assistance, before proceeding forward to the Dakatia banks where he built a fort. Abdul Wahid's army reached the fort in a few days, and a battle commenced resulting in a number of deaths on both sides.

Manikya's forces had also planned a surprise attack at night. However, the raja's chief minister, Mirza Yusuf Barlas, surrendered to Abdul Wahid, who rewarded him as a mansabdar of 500 soldiers and 300 horses. Manikya did not surrender after losing Barlas, and rather retreated to Bhulua at midnight to strengthen the fort there. News of the retreat reached the Mughals two pahars later, and so they began following the raja's forces. Having no time to defend themselves, Manikya retreated further to seek refuge with the Magh king Min Razagyi of Arakan but was defeated at the banks of the Feni River. The Mughals seized all of Manikya's elephants, and Abdul Wahid successfully took control of Bhalwa in 1613.

Aftermath
Under Subahdar Islam Khan I, Bhalwa and Jagdia were established as frontier garrisons as the Mughals were aware of its strategic location as a crossroad between Mughal Bengal and Chittagong, then under the Arakanese kingdom. Bhalwa was integrated into the Sarkar of Sonargaon. Members of the Bishwambhar Sur family were allowed to remain as zamindars .

See also
History of Noakhali
Mirza Baqi, thanadar of Bhalwa

References

Bhulua
Bhulua
Noakhali District
Battles involving the Mughal Empire